Harry V. Quadracci (January 10, 1936 – July 29, 2002) founded Quad/Graphics with his wife Elizabeth Quadracci.

Work at Krueger 
Quadracci worked at W.A.Krueger, but eventually left when a managerial disagreement led to a strike. He was not included when the president of the company reached a settlement, and he felt the negotiating was done behind his back. He interpreted it as a signal that he would not eventually fulfill the role as president of the company. He then left to form his own company.

Company beginnings
Quadracci leased a 20,000 square foot building in Pewaukee, Wisconsin. By 1974 the company had 35 employees.

Contract 
In 1977, Quadracci was able to land Newsweek, and in 2000 landed National Geographic.

Philanthropy 
In 2001, Harry V. Quadracci and his wife Elizabeth Quadracci helped finance the addition to the Milwaukee Art Museum designed by Santiago Calatrava. The Quadraccis donated $10 million in a donation-matching challenge they spearheaded. The addition was named the Quadracci Pavilion.

Death
Quadracci died at 66 years old at Pine Lake in Chenequa, Wisconsin. He suffered from an unknown medical incident which resulted in him drowning.
Wisconsin probate case has his date of birth listed as January not June.

Memorial 
In his memorial Quad/Graphics donated 1 million dollars to Waukesha County Technical College and named a newer area of the school the Harry V. Quadracci Printing and Graphics Center.

The $1 million gift came from Quad/Graphics clients, friends, vendors, and employees who donated to the Harry V. Quadracci Memorial Fund. The contributions totalled $500,000, and then were matched by Quad/Graphics' Windhover Foundation for a total gift of $1 million.

References

1936 births
2002 deaths
People from Chenequa, Wisconsin
Businesspeople from Wisconsin
Philanthropists from Wisconsin
20th-century American businesspeople
21st-century American businesspeople
21st-century philanthropists
Deaths by drowning in the United States
Accidental deaths in Wisconsin
20th-century American philanthropists